Western United Football Club (A-League Women) is an Australian professional women's association football club based in Truganina, Melbourne. The club was formed in 2022 after a successful bid to enter the A-League Women for the 2022–23 season.

The list encompasses the records set by the club, their managers and their players. The player records section itemises the club's leading goalscorers and those who have made most appearances in the A-League Women. Attendance records at City Vista, are also included.

The club's record appearance makers are Hillary Beall, Sydney Cummings, Hannah Keane, Emma Robers and Adriana Taranto, who have currently made ten appearances. Hannah Keane is Western United (A-League Women)'s record goalscorer, scoring nine goals in total.

All figures are correct as of 28 January 2023.

Player records

Appearances
 Most appearances: Hillary Beall, Sydney Cummings, Hannah Keane, Emma Robers and Adriana Taranto, 13
 Youngest first-team player: Kahli Johnson, 18 years, 274 days (against Melbourne Victory, A-League Women, 19 November 2022)
 Oldest first-team player: Aleksandra Sinclair, 35 years, 12 days (against Newcastle Jets, A-League Women, 8 February 2023)
 Most consecutive appearances: 13
 Hillary Beall (from 19 November 2022 to 11 February 2023)
 Sydney Cummings (from 19 November 2022 to 11 February 2023)
 Hannah Keane (from 19 November 2022 to 11 February 2023)
 Emma Robers (from 19 November 2022 to 11 February 2023)
 Adriana Taranto (from 19 November 2022 to 11 February 2023)

Most appearances
Competitive matches only, includes appearances as substitute. Numbers in brackets indicate goals scored.

Goalscorers
 Most goals in a match: 2 goals
 Hannah Keane (against Wellington Phoenix, A-League Women, 26 November 2022)
 Chloe Logarzo (against Melbourne City, A-League Women, 17 December 2022)
 Hannah Keane (against Sydney FC, A-League Women, 26 November 2022)
 Youngest goalscorer: Sydney Cummings, 23 years, 266 days (against Wellington Phoenix, A-League Women, 26 November 2022)
 Oldest goalscorer: Jessica McDonald, 34 years, 271 days (against Wellington Phoenix, A-League Women, 26 November 2022)
 Most consecutive goalscoring appearances: Hannah Keane, 4 (from 11 January 2023 to 28 January 2023) (

Top goalscorers
Competitive matches only. Numbers in brackets indicate appearances made.

Managerial records

 First full-time manager: Mark Torcaso currently manages Western United (A-League Women) from June 2022.
 Highest win percentage: Mark Torcaso, 76.92%
 Lowest win percentage: Mark Torcaso, 76.92%

Club records

Matches
 First match: Western United 1–0 Melbourne Victory, friendly, 5 November 2022
 First A-League Women match: Western United 1–0 Melbourne Victory, 19 November 2022
 Record A-League Women win: 5–0 against Canberra United, 28 January 2023
 Record consecutive wins: 7, from 19 November 2022 to 11 January 2023
 Record consecutive matches without a defeat: 7, from 19 November 2022 to 11 January 2023
 Record consecutive matches without a win: 2, from from 4 February 2023 to 8 February 2023
 Record consecutives defeats: 2, from from 4 February 2023 to 8 February 2023
 Record consecutive matches without conceding a goal: 2, from 7 January 2023 to 11 February 2023

Attendances
This section applies to attendances at City Vista, where Western United (A-League Women) generally play their home matches.

 Highest attendance at City Vista: 2,753, against Melbourne Victory, A-League Women, 19 November 2022
 Lowest attendance at City Vista: 630, against Wellington Phoenix, A-League Women, 7 January 2023

References
General

Western United (A-League Women)
Records